Liang Yi Museum is a private museum of design, craftsmanship and heritage, located in Sheung Wan, Hong Kong Island, Hong Kong.

Started in the 1980s with many of the earlier pieces purchased right on Hollywood Road, the collection has grown to over 400 pieces three decades later. Selected pieces have been exhibited in other museums, including the National Museum of History in Taiwan and the Palace Museum in Beijing. In addition to permanent galleries devoted to furniture, the museum presents a changing array of exhibitions, publications, education and public programmes.

Collections
The museum is home to one of the world's largest collections of Chinese antique furniture, made of the treasured materials huanghuali and zitan, from the Ming and Qing dynasties.

The Liang Yi Museum also houses the world's premier collection of bejewelled clutches, compacts and powder boxes. Made in design houses such as Cartier, Boucheron and Van Cleef & Arpels, these nécessaires and minaudières, glittering with precious stones and showing detailed craftsmanship, were once a staple of every lady's evening wear. With over 800 examples from the late 1880s through to the 1960s, this collection provides a peek at a bygone era and has been lent out to other museums in the past, including the Palace Museum in Beijing and Goldsmiths Hall in London.

In addition to classical Chinese furniture and European vanities, the diverse collections of the museum also include European silver and Japanese decorative works of art.

Exhibitions

References

History museums in Hong Kong
Art museums and galleries in Hong Kong